Poya Bay or Baie de la Poya, also known as Porwi Bay, is a bay of New Caledonia.
It "lies about 2 miles west-northwestward of Cape Goulvain, 2 miles in length, and is entered by Poya Passage, a narrow channel between the reefs, about 800 yards wide." The mouth of the Poya River is located on the bay.

See also
List of rivers of New Caledonia

References

Bays of New Caledonia